The Carolinas Writers Conference takes place in April each year in Wadesboro, North Carolina at the Lockhart-Taylor Center.  The first conference was held in 2009 and was hosted by the Anson County Writers Club, South Piedmont Community College, the Carolinas Romance Writers and the Hampton B. Allen Public Library. The first conference featured two award winning authors: North Carolina author Robert Inman and Floridian Robert Macomber as well as 19 local authors.  In 2012, a storytelling event was added called Back Porch Stories. The keynote speakers in the Fifth Annual Carolinas Writers Conference will be Marjorie Hudson, Rob Dunn, Robert Macomber and Angela Knight.  The storytellers are: Michael R. Harrell, Martha R. Johnson and Tyris Jones.

The fifth annual Carolinas Writers Conference was scheduled for April 20, 2013 at the South Piedmont Community College Lockhart-Taylor campus in Wadesboro, NC.  The authors who will speak and conduct workshops are Rob Dunn, Marjorie Hudson, Robert Macomber and Angela Knight.  

This conference includes Back Porch Stories, held that evening at the Ansonia Theatre.  The Anson Bank & Trust is the presenting sponsor, joining the Anson County Writers Club, the SPCC, Union County Writers Club, The Anson County Tourism Development Authority, and several local businesses in Anson County.  The Anson County Arts Council is co-sponsoring the story-telling event, Back Porch Stories, at the Ansonia Theatre.  
Rob Dunn, a biologist at North Carolina State University, is the author of Every Living Thing and The Wild Life of Our Bodies.  Robert Macomber's 10th novel, Honorable Lies,  in his award-winning Honor series was released in October 2012. When not writing, the author is an internationally recognized lecturer and television commentator on maritime history. Marjorie Hudson is the author of Accidental Birds of the Carolinas, a PEN/Hemingway Honorable Mention for Distinguished First Fiction, and Searching for Virginia Dare (2007), a North Carolina Arts Council Notable Book.

Angela Knight has written 21 novellas and twelve novels and is the New York Times bestselling author of the Mageverse paranormal series.  She and her husband, Lt. Michael Woodcock, will discuss writing fight scenes and conducting hostage negotiations, based on his experience as a veteran police officer.

References

External links

Angelasknights.com
Robertmacomber.com
Robrdunn.com
Marjoriehudson.com

Events in North Carolina